Herzensteinia microcephalus is a species of cyprinid fish endemic to China.  It is the only species in its genus.

References

Cyprinid fish of Asia
Taxa named by Solomon Herzenstein
Freshwater fish of China
Fish described in 1891